Alexander Sutherland (born 7 September 1987) is a Scottish former professional footballer who last played for Brora Rangers. Born in Wick, he grew up in the village of Helmsdale in Sutherland.

He made his début for Inverness Caledonian Thistle in a home game against Falkirk. In the next season, Sutherland's appearances were limited by then manager Charlie Christie. His first game of the season saw him come on as a substitute against Dunfermline Athletic in September. However, he did not play with the first team again until December in a game against Kilmarnock. He conceded a penalty kick which was the winning goal in a 4–3 win for Killie. Sutherland did not play again until April, against Kilmarnock again and then Dunfermline again in May.

He scored his first goal for the club in July 2007, in a pre-season victory over Clachnacuddin. When Craig Brewster was appointed manager in September 2007, Sutherland was sent on loan to Elgin City on loan for the season. This proved to be a good move for Sutherland, as he was voted Elgin's player of the season, only missed a handful of games and was nominated for the Third Division player of the year. He returned to Inverness CT in April 2008, and signed a new one-year contract in the same month, but left the club at the end of the contract.

He joined Buckie Thistle in 2011 and then moved to Brora Rangers in 2013.

References

External links

1987 births
Living people
Scottish footballers
Inverness Caledonian Thistle F.C. players
Elgin City F.C. players
Peterhead F.C. players
Buckie Thistle F.C. players
Brora Rangers F.C. players
Scottish Premier League players
Scottish Football League players
Association football wingers
Sportspeople from Highland (council area)
People educated at Golspie High School
People from Helmsdale